Nautococcus is a genus of true bugs belonging to the family Margarodidae.

Species:
 Nautococcus schraderae Vayssière, 1939

References

Margarodidae